Llangefni (meaning "church on the River Cefni") is the county town of Anglesey in Wales and contains the principal offices of the Isle of Anglesey County Council.  United Kingdom Census 2011 recorded Llangefni's population as 5,116 people, making it the second largest settlement in the county. The community includes the village of Rhosmeirch.

Location
The town is near the centre of Anglesey, and is on the River Cefni, after which it is named. Its attractions include the Oriel Ynys Môn museum, which details the history of Anglesey and houses collections of the painters Kyffin Williams and Charles Tunnicliffe. In the west of the town is a large secondary school, Ysgol Gyfun Llangefni (Llangefni Comprehensive School), and in the north a Victorian parish church, St Cyngar's, set in a wooded riverside location called the Dingle. The town was formerly named Llangyngar, Welsh for "St Cyngar's church".

Commerce, transport and education

Llangefni is a commercial and farming town in Anglesey and once hosted the largest cattle market on the island. There is a relatively large industrial estate, which includes a large chicken processing plant, the largest single industrial operation in the town, as well as several other small businesses.

The town had a station on the Anglesey Central Railway line which opened in 1864. It closed in 1964, although goods trains continued to pass through the town until 1993. Although no longer used, the railway tracks have not been removed. There are frequent buses to the larger settlements of Bangor and Holyhead as well as to the smaller towns of Amlwch and Beaumaris. By road the town is just 2 kilometres from the major A55 and A5 roads, via the short A5114. Water for the town comes from Llyn Cefni, a reservoir  to the northwest.

Llangefni hosted the National Eisteddfod in 1957 and 1983, and in 1999 gave its name to the Eisteddfod held at the nearby village of Llanbedrgoch. It also hosted the Urdd Eisteddfod (youth Eisteddfod) in 2004. The town also has a college, Coleg Menai (Llangefni site).

Llangefni is home to the headquarters of large builders merchant chain Huws Gray. The company currently has over 100 branches across the UK.

Sport
The local association football club, Llangefni Town, was promoted to the Welsh Premier League at the end of the 2006–07 season, but relegated one season later.

The local rugby club is Llangefni RFC, which plays in the WRU leagues. The club recently gained promotion to Division 2 West, but the WRU then decided to demote the club back to Division 4 North Wales league.

Welsh language skills 
According to the 2011 Census, Llangefni is the community with the highest percentage of Welsh speakers on the Isle of Anglesey, and the 6th highest in Wales. 80.7% of residents aged three and over reported being able to speak Welsh in the 2011 Census, as compared to 83.8% reporting being able to do so in the 2001 Census. 91.6% of those born in Wales could speak Welsh.

Governance

Llangefni is in the Canolbarth Môn electoral ward which also includes four other neighbouring communities in the centre of the island, electing three county councillors to the Isle of Anglesey County Council. Prior to the 2012 Anglesey electoral boundary changes the town was represented by three county councillors elected from three wards, Cefni, Cyngar and Tudur.

Cefni, Cyngar and Tudur remain as community wards, electing the thirteen community councillors to Llangefni Town Council, the community council of the town.

The county administration took place in Llangefni Shire Hall from 1899 until 1974. The shire hall was re-designated the "Borough Council Offices" in 1974 and became the headquarters of Ynys Mon Borough Council. Brand new council offices were built at Llangefni in the 1990s for the new unitary authority, Isle of Anglesey County Council.

Notable people
 John Elias (1774-1841), preacher, lived in the town 1830–41
 Christmas Evans (1766–1838), preacher and chapel builder, lived in the town 1791–1826
 Gabriel Fielding (1916–1986), author, attended Llangefni County School, in 1934
 Huw Garmon (born 1966), a Welsh actor
 Nathan Gill (born 1973), politician, former Leader of Reform UK Wales; lives in Llangefni
 Hugh Griffith (1912–1980), Oscar‑winning actor, attended Llangefni County School in his youth
 Hywel Gwynfryn (born 1942), television and radio personality, studied at Ysgol Gyfun Llangefni
 Myfanwy Howell (1903-1988), Welsh language radio and television broadcaster
 Naomi Watts (born 1968), Oscar‑nominated actress, lived in the town between the ages of 7 and 10
 Kyffin Williams (1918–2006), Welsh landscape painter

References

External links

 
 photos of Llangefni and surrounding area on geograph
 

 
Towns in Anglesey
County towns in Wales